Maryland Route 256 (MD 256) is a state highway in the U.S. state of Maryland. The highway runs  from MD 2 at Tracys Landing east to MD 468 in Shady Side. MD 256 connects the aforementioned communities with Deale on the shore of Herring Bay in southern Anne Arundel County. The highway was constructed at either end in the mid-1920s and completed through Deale in the early 1930s.

Route description

MD 256 begins at an intersection with MD 2 (Solomons Island Road) at Tracys Landing. The state highway heads east as two-lane undivided Deale Road, passing south of Traceys Elementary School and Deale-Traceys Park. MD 256 enters the community of Deale, which features several marinas. The highway crosses Tracys Creek and curves north, then makes a right-angle turn east at Rockhold Creek Road and crosses Rockhold Creek. In the center of Deale, at Masons Beach Road, MD 256 turns north onto Deale Churchton Road. The highway meets the eastern end of MD 258 (Bay Front Road) at a roundabout. MD 256 continues through the hamlet of Churchton, where Franklin Manor Road splits east toward Franklin Manor-on-the-Bay. The state highway reaches its eastern terminus at MD 468 in Shady Side. That highway heads west as Muddy Creek Road toward Galesville and east as Shady Side Road into the center of the namesake community.

History

This segment was originally designated as MD 257. A second segment of MD 256 was constructed as a gravel road of the same width from MD 255 (now MD 468) in Shady Side south through Churchton to Swamp Circle Road north of the center of Deale in 1926. The gap through Deale was filled in 1932 and 1933. MD 256 replaced all of MD 257 in 1939. The roundabout at MD 256's junction with MD 258 was installed in 2007.

Junction list

See also

References

External links 

 MDRoads: MD 256

256
Maryland Route 256